The scarlet-fronted parakeet (Psittacara wagleri), also known as the scarlet-fronted conure, red-fronted conure or Wagler's conure, is a long-tailed South American species of parrot.
It is found in Colombia and Venezuela.
Its natural habitats are subtropical or tropical dry forest, subtropical or tropical moist lowland forest, subtropical or tropical moist montane forest, and especially high-altitude shrubland and forest; it is also known to visit heavily degraded former forest.
It was formerly considered conspecific with the Cordilleran parakeet, and still is by some authorities.

Description 
Red plumage may extend over the top of the head to just behind the eyes, depending on the race. Scattered red feathering may also be present on the throat and wings. Thighs are red. Sexes are alike. Young birds have greatly reduced area of red on the head.

References

External links

scarlet-fronted parakeet
Birds of the Colombian Andes
Birds of the Venezuelan Andes
Birds of the Sierra Nevada de Santa Marta
Birds of the Venezuelan Coastal Range
scarlet-fronted parakeet
scarlet-fronted parakeet
Taxonomy articles created by Polbot